This is a season-by-season list of records compiled by Colgate in men's ice hockey.

Colgate University has made five appearances in the NCAA Tournament, making the Frozen Four and championship game once.

Season-by-season results

Note: GP = Games played, W = Wins, L = Losses, T = Ties

* Winning percentage is used when conference schedules are unbalanced.† Terry Slater died on December 6th, four days after suffering a stroke.

Footnotes

References

 
Lists of college men's ice hockey seasons in the United States
Colgate Raiders ice hockey seasons